Norman Westbrook Shepard (August 20, 1897 – August 22, 1977) was a head coach of various college athletics at several American colleges and universities.  He is best known for being the only Division I college basketball coach to go undefeated in his first season coaching. His 1923–24 Tar Heels team finished the season with a 26–0 record and was retroactively named the national champion by the Helms Athletic Foundation and the Premo-Porretta Power Poll.

Background and family
He was born Norman Westbrook Shepard, third son of Alexander Hurlbutt Shepard and Mary Augusta Westbrook.

Shepard attended the University of North Carolina and after graduating played minor league baseball for a time.  Before becoming a head coach, Shepard spent three years abroad in France during World War I in the United States army as an artilleryman.

In 1928, he married Edith Ruckert, of Brooklyn, NY, in Peking, China.

Norman's family had various ties to athletics at North Carolina.  His brother, Bo Shepard, became the head coach for North Carolina after Norman, and two of his other brothers, Caryle Shepard and Alex Shepard, played basketball for North Carolina.

Coach of North Carolina Tar Heels
Shepard decided to accept the head coaching job for the Tar Heels while planning to attend law school on the side.

When Shepard took over, the Tar Heels had been without a head coach for the previous two seasons.  Even though the Tar Heels had been without a head coach for the previous seasons, they had managed to win the Southern Conference Tournament at the end of the 1921–22 season and tied for first in the Southern Conference during the 1922–23 season.

When Shepard took over the team, he inherited a well-rounded Tar Heel squad that included returning senior Cartwright Carmichael, who was the first North Carolina All-American in any sport, and Jack Cobb, who would later be named to the All-American team and would later have his number retired at North Carolina.  Shepard's North Carolina team earned the nickname the "White Phantoms" because of their fast playmaking and defense.

The 1923–24 Tar Heels squad managed to win all 26 games they played that year.  Because there was no national post-season tournament, the Tar Heels final game was in the Southern Conference tournament against the University of Alabama Crimson Tide.  The Tar Heels managed to win the game 26–18.  The local news reported that hundreds of students at North Carolina "waited in the streets in front of telegraph offices and cafes" for news about the game and after the victory students "went wild" and set a bonfire on the athletic field.

In 1936, the Helms Athletic Foundation retroactively awarded a national championship to the team since there had been no organization to award national championships at the time. Currently Shepard holds the title of being the only head coach to go undefeated in his first year of coaching.

Living abroad
After coaching North Carolina for one season, Shepard went to the Far East to work as a sales manager for Liggett and Meyer tobacco company.  While abroad, he played for and coached a basketball team in the Far Eastern Olympics. Shepard married his wife while in China and returned to the United States after being abroad for five years.

Return to coaching
After returning to the United States, Shepard took coaching jobs at Guilford College, Randolph College, Davidson College and finally Harvard University where he coached baseball, basketball and football. He retired from being the head coach in 1968.

Head coaching record

Football

Basketball

References
General
 
 
 

Specific

1897 births
1977 deaths
American men's basketball coaches
American men's basketball players
United States Army personnel of World War I
Davidson Wildcats athletic directors
Davidson Wildcats baseball coaches
Davidson Wildcats men's basketball coaches
Guilford College faculty
Guilford Quakers athletic directors
Guilford Quakers football coaches
Guilford Quakers men's basketball coaches
Harvard Crimson baseball coaches
Harvard Crimson men's basketball coaches
North Carolina Tar Heels men's basketball coaches
North Carolina Tar Heels men's basketball players
People from Marion, South Carolina
Randolph–Macon Yellow Jackets athletic directors
Randolph–Macon Yellow Jackets football coaches
Randolph–Macon Yellow Jackets men's basketball coaches